Rolf Lund (6 May 1930 – 5 May 1991) was a Norwegian sailor. He was born in Oslo. He competed at the 1972 Summer Olympics in Munich.

References

External links 
 

1930 births
1991 deaths
Sportspeople from Oslo
Olympic sailors of Norway
Norwegian male sailors (sport)
Sailors at the 1972 Summer Olympics – Soling